Urška Klakočar Zupančič (born  19 June 1977 in Trbovlje) is a Slovenian lawyer and politician. 

She is a member and vice-chairperson of the Freedom Movement political party. In the 2022 Slovenian parliamentary election, she got elected to the National Assembly. On 13 May 2022, she was elected as the Speaker of the National Assembly, she became the first woman to hold this position.

References 

1977 births
Living people
Presidents of the National Assembly (Slovenia)
Members of the National Assembly (Slovenia)